Sargent is an unincorporated community in Scott County, in the U.S. state of Missouri.

The community has the name of the Sargent family, proprietors of a 19th-century sawmill.

References

Unincorporated communities in Scott County, Missouri
Unincorporated communities in Missouri